Lishui River (also known as Li River, Chinese language: 澧水, pinyin: lǐshuǐ, Wade-Giles: li3-shui3) is a river in Hunan province of China,  one of the Yangtze River's four largest tributaries in the province.

Lishui has three origination places, the north, the middle and the south. The north one is the most important place, origination from Shanmujie of Sangzhi County in Zhangjiajie. The middle one, origination from the east side of the Badagong Mountain in Sangzhi and the south place, origination from Longjiazhai of Yongshun County in Xiangxi. The three originations join the main river in Nancha of Sangzhi, then runs east. Loushui River is a tributary of Lishui River.

It flows into the Dongting Lake at Xiaodukou in Jinshi.

Cities along the river include (listed from mouth to source)
 Jinshi
 Lixian
 Shimen
Cili
 Zhangjiajie

See also
 Geography of China
 List of rivers in China

References

External links

Rivers of Hunan
Tributaries of the Yangtze River